"Autostop" is a 1979 Italian-language song performed by Patty Pravo, written by her then-husband Paul Jeffery, Maurizio Monti, and Pravo herself under her birth name Nicoletta Strambelli. It was released as the only single from Pravo's 1979 LP Munich Album, with English-language songs "New York" and "Cry, Cry, Gotta Worry" as the B-sides in Italy and Germany, respectively. The single was a success for the singer and reached #13 on the Italian charts.

Track listing
7" single
A. "Autostop" (Paul Jeffery, Maurizio Monti, Nicoletta Strambelli) – 4:00
B. "New York" (Franco Migliacci, Flavio Paulin) – 4:14

7" single (Germany)
A. "Autostop" – 4:00
B. "Cry, Cry, Gotta Worry" – 3:48

References

1979 singles
1979 songs
Italian songs
Patty Pravo songs

it:Autostop/New York